King is an unincorporated community in Clay County, West Virginia, United States.

References 

Unincorporated communities in West Virginia
Unincorporated communities in Clay County, West Virginia
Charleston, West Virginia metropolitan area